The 1982 Miami Dolphins season was the team's seventeenth in the National Football League (NFL). The Dolphins were coming off an unexpected 11–4–1 1981 season and a devastating loss to the San Diego Chargers in the Divisional Round the previous season in a game dubbed the Epic in Miami. The team had clinched the 2 seed and were picked by many to reach the Super Bowl during the 1981 season. Because of the high number of picks to reach the Super Bowl the previous season, many more fans picked them to win it during the 1982 season. The Dolphins looked to improve on their 11–4–1 record from 1981. However, a players strike cancelled 7 of the team's 16 games. Because of this, the NFL schedule was shrunk to 9 games. The Dolphins started out fresh, winning their first 2 games prior to the strike. When season play resumed 2 months later, the Dolphins defeated the Buffalo Bills 9–7 in Buffalo to clinch a 3–0 start. After a loss to Tampa Bay, they defeated the Minnesota Vikings 22–14. The next week, they lost a brisk game against the Patriots 3–0 in a game called the Snowplow Game. The Dolphins would then win 3 straight games to end the season 7–2, tied for second in the AFC with the Cincinnati Bengals. The Dolphins won 2nd place over them by virtue of a series of tiebreakers. In the playoffs, they defeated the Patriots in a rematch by the score of 28–13. They then defeated the Chargers in a rematch of the 1981 Divisional Playoffs by a score of 34–13. In the AFC Championship game, they shutout the Jets, 14–0 to reach the Super Bowl for the first time since 1973. In Super Bowl XVII, they lost to the Redskins 27–17 in a rematch of Super Bowl VII which concluded Miami's perfect 1972 season.

Off-season

NFL draft

Roster

Regular season 
The Dolphins' main strength was their defense, nicknamed the "Killer Bees" because 6 of their 11 starters had last names that began with the letter "B". The "Killer Bees", anchored by Pro Bowl defensive tackle Bob Baumhower, led the league in fewest total yards allowed (2,312) and fewest passing yards allowed (1,027). Linebacker A. J. Duhe was extremely effective at blitzing and in pass coverage. And the Dolphins secondary, consisting of defensive backs Don McNeal, Gerald Small and brothers Lyle and Glenn Blackwood, combined for 11 interceptions.

However, the Dolphins' passing attack, led by quarterback David Woodley, ranked last in the league with 1,401 total yards, 8 touchdowns, and 13 interceptions. One of the few bright spots in the Dolphins passing attack was wide receiver Jimmy Cefalo, who gained 356 yards off just 17 receptions, an average of 20.9 yards per catch. Wide receiver Duriel Harris also provided a deep threat with 22 receptions for 331 yards.

But Miami's strength on offense was their running game, ranking 3rd in the league with 1,344 yards. Pro Bowl running back Andra Franklin was the team's top rusher with 701 yards and 7 touchdowns. Running back Tony Nathan rushed for 233 yards, and caught 16 passes for another 114 yards. Woodley himself also recorded 207 rushing yards and 2 touchdowns. One reason for the Dolphins' rushing success was the blocking of their offensive line, led by future hall of fame center Dwight Stephenson, along with Pro Bowlers Bob Kuechenberg and Ed Newman.

Snowplow Game 
In National Football League lore, the Snowplow Game refers to a regular-season game played between the Miami Dolphins and New England Patriots on December 12, 1982.

Playing in a heavy snowstorm at New England's Schaefer Stadium in Foxborough, Massachusetts, the two teams remained scoreless late into the fourth quarter. With 4:45 left to go in the game and on-field conditions worsening, Patriots coach Ron Meyer summoned Mark Henderson, who was a convict on a work release program, and was the stadium's snowplow operator that afternoon – and in the face of furious protests from Miami coach Don Shula – was directed to veer off course and clear a spot on the field for placekicker John Smith, with Matt Cavanaugh putting down the hold. The kick was good and the Patriots took a 3–0 lead into the final minutes of the game.

The Rest of the Story
What is often left untold is what happened after John Smith kicked the go-ahead field goal. Despite the snowy conditions, the Dolphins methodically marched down the field on the strength of their running backs Andra Franklin and Tony Nathan and Quarterback David Woodley. With about a minute left in the game, and well within field goal range, the Dolphins faced a 4th down. Mark Henderson had driven his John Deere tractor down to that side of the field and was ready at motion from the referee, to go out on the field and clear a path for Dolphins Kicker Uwe von Schamann. Shula decided to go for the first down instead of a tying field goal. The Patriots stopped the Dolphins and took over on downs.

Henderson was released from prison a few years after the game, and currently works in the construction business. Henderson's plow was actually a John Deere Model 314 tractor with a sweeper attached. When he was being interviewed by a TV reporter about the controversy, Henderson jokingly replied, "What are they gonna do, throw me in jail?" Smith's subsequent field goal gave the Patriots a 3–0 lead that held until the final gun. The game ball was awarded to all-pro linebacker Steve Nelson, who subsequently donated it to his alma mater, North Dakota State University. Henderson also received a game ball from a gracious Meyer after the game. The following year, the NFL banned the use of snowplows on the field during a game. The moment became an interactive feature of the new Hall at Patriot Place when it opened in 2008 next to Gillette Stadium.

Schedule 

Note: Intra-division opponents are in bold text.

Season summary

Week 1 at Jets

Week 2

Week 15 vs Jets

The 1972 Miami Dolphins team was honored during the game.

Playoffs

Standings

Postseason

AFC first round 
 Miami Dolphins 28, New England Patriots 13

AFC Divisional Playoff 
 Miami Dolphins 34, San Diego Chargers 13

AFC Championship Game 
 Miami Dolphins 14, New York Jets 0

Super Bowl XVII 
 Miami Dolphins 17, Washington Redskins 27

at Rose Bowl (stadium), Pasadena, California

Scoring summary 
 MIA – TD: Jimmy Cefalo 76-yard pass from David Woodley (Uwe von Schamann kick) 7–0 MIA
 WAS – FG: Mark Moseley 31 yards 7–3 MIA
 MIA – FG: Uwe von Schamann 20 yards 10–3 MIA
 WAS – TD: Alvin Garrett 4-yard pass from Joe Theismann (Mark Moseley kick) 10–10 tie
 MIA – TD: Fulton Walker 98-yard kickoff return (Uwe von Schamann kick) 17–10 MIA
 WAS – FG: Mark Moseley 20 yards 17–13 MIA
 WAS – TD: John Riggins 43-yard run (Mark Moseley kick) 20–17 WAS
 WAS – TD: Charlie Brown 6-yard pass from Joe Theismann (Mark Moseley kick) 27–17 WAS

Awards and honors 
Pro Bowl players
FB Andra Franklin, NT Bob Baumhower

Notes and references 

 Miami Dolphins on Pro Football Reference
 Miami Dolphins on jt-sw.com

Miami
American Football Conference championship seasons
Miami Dolphins seasons
Miami Dolphins